Walter Pico (born 18 March 1969 in Argentina) is an Argentinean retired footballer.

References

Argentine footballers
Living people
Association football midfielders
Association football forwards
1969 births
Club Atlético Vélez Sarsfield footballers
UD Las Palmas players
Albacete Balompié players
FC Cartagena footballers
Extremadura UD footballers